Michelle Fournier (born May 9, 1977 in Edmundston, New Brunswick) is a retired female hammer thrower from Canada. Her personal best throw was 65.63 metres, achieved on July 22, 2000 in Lethbridge.

Achievements

References

External links

sports-reference

1977 births
Living people
Canadian female hammer throwers
Athletes (track and field) at the 1998 Commonwealth Games
Athletes (track and field) at the 2002 Commonwealth Games
Athletes (track and field) at the 1999 Pan American Games
Athletes (track and field) at the 2000 Summer Olympics
Olympic track and field athletes of Canada
Commonwealth Games competitors for Canada
Pan American Games track and field athletes for Canada
Sportspeople from New Brunswick
People from Edmundston
South Carolina Gamecocks women's track and field athletes